Gerardus Craeyvanger or Gerardus Kraijvanger (Utrecht, January 13, 1775- Utrecht, March 10, 1855) was a Dutch violin player and baritone. He also worked as a chorus director and singing teacher.

His parents were Gijsbertus Craeyvanger and Geertruida Klingen. His sister, Gertrudis Craeyvange, was a writer. He married Johanna Swillens and later Margaretha Swillens. He is the father of the painters Gijsbertus Craeyvanger and Reinier Craeyvanger, and of the violinist Carolus Arnoldus Craeyvanger.

Notes

1775 births
1855 deaths
Dutch baritones
Dutch violinists